Middle Fork II Township is a township in Forsyth County, North Carolina, United States. As of the 2010 Census, it had a population of 2,639. Middle Fork II Township was formed in April 2003, when Middle Fork Township was split into Middle Fork II Township and Middle Fork I Township.

References

Townships in Forsyth County, North Carolina
Townships in North Carolina